Ann Preston (December 1, 1813April 18, 1872) was an American physician, activist, and educator.

Early life
Ann Preston was the first woman dean of  a medical school, the Woman's Medical College of Pennsylvania (WMCP), which was the first medical school in the world to admit women exclusively.  At a time when the medical profession was nearly all-male and considered unacceptably coarse for women to enter,  Ann Preston campaigned for her female students to be admitted to clinical lectures at the Blockley Philadelphia Hospital, and the Pennsylvania Hospital. Despite the open hostility of male medical students, and sometimes of male faculty,  Preston determinedly negotiated the best educational opportunities for the students of WMCP.

Preston was born in 1813 in  West Grove, Pennsylvania, outside of Philadelphia, to prosperous farmer and prominent Quaker Amos Preston and his wife Margaret Smith Preston. One of eight siblings, she was educated in a local Quaker school and later briefly attended a Quaker boarding school in nearby Chester, Pennsylvania. The Chester County Quaker community was ardently abolitionist and pro-temperance, and the Preston family farm, Prestonville, was known as safe harbor for escaped slaves.  As the eldest daughter, Ann took on the responsibility of  caring for family during her mother’s frequent illnesses, interrupting her formal education.   She began to attend lectures at the local lyceum, belonged to the local literary society, became a member of the Clarkson Anti-Slavery Society, and was active in the temperance and women’s rights movement.

Once her younger siblings were old enough, Preston began to work locally as a schoolteacher. In 1849, she published a book of nursery rhymes, Cousin Ann's Stories. By the 1840s, she became interested in educating women about their bodies and taught all-female classes on hygiene and physiology. She was privately educated in medicine by apprenticing to Dr.  Nathaniel Moseley from 1847–1849. Unable to gain admittance to medical schools because of their policies against admitting women, Preston  entered the Quaker-founded Female Medical College of Pennsylvania (later changed to Woman's Medical College of Pennsylvania in 1867) at the age of 38 as a student in its inaugural class of 1850.  While studying at the Female Medical College In 1851, Preston wrote to her friend and fellow Quaker activist Hannah Darlington:

She graduated in 1851, one of eight women awarded a medical degree. Dr. Preston returned to the college the following year for postgraduate work, and was appointed professor of physiology and hygiene there in 1853. In 1862 she led the effort  to found the Woman’s Hospital of Philadelphia in order to provide sorely needed clinical training to the college’s students. During the American Civil War, the college closed for the 1861–62 sessions due to lack of regular finances.  At this time Preston, whose health has always been precarious, fell ill from rheumatic fever, stress, and exhaustion, and was admitted to  the Pennsylvania Hospital for the Insane for three months to recuperate under the care of Dr. Thomas S. Kirkbride, a Quaker physician who advocated for the "humane treatment" of the mentally ill.

When the Female Medical College resumed operations in October 1862, it re-opened in rooms rented from the Women's Hospital of Philadelphia. In 1864, a rift emerged among the faculty when Dean Edwin Fussell tried to prevent student Mary Putnam Jacobi from graduating with a medical degree, feeling that she did not meet the required qualifications. Other faculty, including Dr. Preston, strongly supported Jacobi and disagreed with the decision. Following the incident, Fussell, an early faculty member and nephew of college founder Bartholomew Fussell, resigned and Preston became dean of the college from 1866–1872.

Career at Woman's Medical College of Pennsylvania 

Ann Preston was the first woman to become the dean of a medical school, a position that allowed her to champion the right of women to become physicians. Preston was also what historian Steve Peitzman calls an "Institution builder," guiding the college through its post-war rebuilding and growth. She was a "fighting Quaker, her weapons being moral suasion, active example, and...the forceful written word." In addition to the hospital she founded before becoming dean, she opened a school of nursing, and continued to push for educational opportunities for the female students of Woman's Medical College, including more and better clinical experience. In 1867 the Philadelphia County Medical Society objected to the practice of medicine by women.  Ann Preston's response in part was "...we must protest...against the injustice which places difficulties in our way, not because we are ignorant or incompetent or unmindful in the code of medical or Christian ethics, but because we are women." Preston's defense disarmed much of the adverse criticism.

In 1868, Preston negotiated with Philadelphia's Blockley Hospital to allow Woman's Medical College of Pennsylvania students to attend the general clinics there. In 1869 she made a similar arrangement with the Pennsylvania Hospital, where in November 1869, a group of about thirty of Woman's Med students were verbally and physically harassed by male medical students. Anna Broomall, 1871 graduate of Woman's Med and future faculty member, recalled "the [male] students rushed in pell-mell, stood up in the seats, hooted, called us names and threw spitballs, trying in vain to dislodge us." The incident sparked very public debates in the local and national press about the propriety of the presence of female medical students at clinical demonstrations but the result was the inevitability and acceptance of co-ed clinics.

In addition to educating medical students and advocating for woman physicians, Dr. Preston also practiced medicine, attending at Woman's Hospital and maintaining her own private practice. She never married, but led a rich and active social and professional life, including establishing a household "where dear friends live with me in harmonious relations, and do much to make this an orderly home circle." She continued to write and work for social reform until she suffered from an attack of acute articular rheumatism in 1871, which left her in a weakened state. She suffered a relapse the following year and died on April 18, 1872.

Bibliography
 Cousin Ann's Stories for Children (1849; re-issued 2011)
 She also published various essays on the medical education of women.

Files of Ann Preston
Preston Family Bible (includes family register in center), 1838 
Poem, "The Child's Playhouse", 1842 
Poem, "To a Departed Sister", 1843 
Cousin Ann's Stories for Children (Philadelphia, J.M. McKim; 36 pages), 1849 
System of Human Anatomy, general and special, by Wilson Erasmus, M.D. (Philadelphia), 1850. Owned, signed and annotated.
Address on the Occasion of the Centennial Celebration of the Founding of the Pennsylvania Hospital, by George B. Wood, M.D., 1851. Owned, signed and annotated.
Addresses and lectures (including an introductory lecture, 2 valedictory addresses, and "Women as Physicians", 1855, 1858, 1867, 1870.
Letter to the Board of Managers of the Pennsylvania Hospital, 1856.
Letters to Sarah Coates, 1831 March 21, undated.
Poem, "It's Good to Live. A Thanksgiving Hymn", undated.
Poem, "Remember me when far away...", undated.
Letters to Sarah Coates, 1831, 1846, undated.
Letters to unknown recipients, 1831, 1854.
Letters to Hannah M. Darlington, 1833-1851, undated.
Letters to Lavinia M. Passmore, 1843, 1860, 1868.
Letters from William Darlington, 1860.
"Address in Memory of Ann Preston, M.D.," by Elizabeth E. Judson, M.D., 1873 March 11.
Letter to Dr. Alsop, undated.
Information regarding the collected copies and locations of originals, 1968-1969.

Quotes

Achievements
 First woman dean of the Woman's Medical College of Pennsylvania

References

Further reading

External links
Women in Medicine Collection , Legacy Center Archives and Special Collections of the Drexel University College of Medicine
Doctor or Doctress? The First Female Medical College: " Will You Accept or Reject Them?"
Doctor or Doctress? Pioneers in the Face of Adversity: " The Mob of '69"
Chester County Historical Society

 Ann Preston, The Online Books Page, University of Pennsylvania
 Philadelphia General Hospital (Old Blockley): Philadelphians "ain't goin' to no Bellevue"
 History of the Pennsylvania Hospital

1813 births
1872 deaths
American abolitionists
People from Chester County, Pennsylvania
Writers from Pennsylvania
American Quakers
19th-century American women writers
19th-century American physicians
American temperance activists
19th-century American women physicians
Quaker abolitionists